Cognatishimia is a Gram-negative and aerobic genus of bacteria from the family of Rhodobacteraceae with one known species (Cognatishimia maritima). Cognatishimia maritima has been isolated from sea water near Gheje Island in Korea.

References

Rhodobacteraceae
Bacteria genera
Monotypic bacteria genera